Shohada Al Sabeen School is a school located in the Hadda neighborhood of the southern outskirts of Sana'a, Yemen, located immediately north of Hadda Park.It is noted for its summer camp.

References

Buildings and structures in Sanaa
Schools in Yemen